Pete Sampras defeated Carlos Moyá in the final, 6–2, 6–3, 6–3 to win the men's singles tennis title at the 1997 Australian Open.

Boris Becker was the defending champion, but lost in the first round to Moyá.

This tournament was notable for being the first major in which Lleyton Hewitt competed in the main draw. He would compete in the Australian Open for a record twenty consecutive years.

Seeds

  Pete Sampras (champion)
  Michael Chang (semifinals)
  Goran Ivanišević (quarterfinals)
  Yevgeny Kafelnikov (withdrew)
  Thomas Muster (semifinals)
  Boris Becker (first round)
  Thomas Enqvist (fourth round)
  Wayne Ferreira (fourth round)
  Marcelo Ríos (quarterfinals)
  Albert Costa (quarterfinals)
  Jim Courier (fourth round)
  Magnus Gustafsson (second round)
  Jan Siemerink (first round)
  Félix Mantilla (quarterfinals)
  Michael Stich (second round)
  Alberto Berasategui (third round)

Qualifying

Draw

Finals

Top half

Section 1

Section 2

Section 3

Section 4

Bottom half

Section 5

Section 6

Section 7

Section 8

References

External links
 Association of Tennis Professionals (ATP) – 1997 Australian Open Men's Singles draw
 1997 Australian Open – Men's draws and results at the International Tennis Federation

Mens singles
Australian Open (tennis) by year – Men's singles